Hatim Belal (born 30 January 1994) is a Saudi professional football player who plays for Al-Arabi as a defender and midfielder.

Career
He began his career with Al-Ansar where he was promoted from the youth team to the first team. Belal spent 1 season with the first team before joining Al-Wehda in the summer of 2014. Belal helped Al-Wehda win promotion to the Pro League in his first season with the club. He spent 3 seasons with Al-Wehda and made 34 league appearances scoring 3 goals. At the end of the 2016–17 season, Al-Wehda were relegated back to the First Division. In the summer of 2017, Belal joined Al-Fayha on a 4 year contract.

On 18 July 2022, Belal joined Al-Arabi.

References

External links 
 

1994 births
Living people
People from Medina
Saudi Arabian footballers
Al-Wehda Club (Mecca) players
Al-Ansar FC (Medina) players
Al-Fayha FC players
Al-Qadsiah FC players
Al-Bukayriyah FC players
Al-Arabi SC (Saudi Arabia) players
Saudi First Division League players
Saudi Professional League players
Association football defenders
Association football midfielders